Leondino Giombini (born 30 January 1975 in Ancona) is a volleyball player from Italy, who won the gold medal with the Men's National Team at the 1999 European Championship in Vienna, Austria. He earned a total number of 134 caps for the Azzurri.

References
 FIVB Profile

1975 births
Living people
Italian men's volleyball players
Sportspeople from Ancona
Universiade medalists in volleyball
Universiade bronze medalists for Italy
Medalists at the 1995 Summer Universiade